This is a list of notable North American Scholarship organizations.

North American oriented Scholarship
North American scholarships
Scholarships